Antonino Giovanni Ribisi (born December 17, 1974) is an American actor. He is known for his starring roles in the TV series Sneaky Pete (2015–2019) and the films Lost in Translation (2003), Gardener of Eden (2007), Avatar (2009),  Ted (2012) and its sequel Ted 2 (2015), Contraband (2012),  Selma (2014), and A Million Ways to Die in the West (2014). He also had recurring roles in television series such as The Wonder Years (1992–1993), Friends (1995–1998, 2003) and My Name Is Earl (2005–2008).

Early life
Ribisi was born in Los Angeles on December 17, 1974. His father, Al Ribisi, is a musician who had been the keyboard player in People!, and his mother, Gay, is a manager of actors and writers. He is the twin brother of actress Marissa Ribisi and the brother of voice actress Gina Ribisi.

Career
Ribisi began acting when he was young, and was in the 1980s sitcom My Two Dads and in films during the 1990s. He had a prominent part as a recurring character in the popular 1990s sitcom Friends, playing the half brother of Phoebe Buffay.  Later, for My Name Is Earl, he was nominated for the Primetime Emmy Award for Outstanding Guest Actor in a Comedy Series. Ribisi starred in James Cameron's Avatar.

In 2016, Ribisi directed a music video for "Siberian Nights", the third single from Ash & Ice by The Kills.

Ribisi starred as Marius/“Pete” in the Amazon series Sneaky Pete over its three seasons.

Personal life
Ribisi married actress Mariah O'Brien in 1997 and together they have a daughter. The couple divorced in 2001. In 2007, he began a relationship with indie rock singer-songwriter Cat Power. The couple lived together for five years before ending their relationship in 2012. Ribisi married English model Agyness Deyn on June 16, 2012, and filed for divorce in January 2015. He announced the birth of his fraternal twins with girlfriend Emily Ward in December 2018.

Ribisi is an active Scientologist.

Filmography

Film

Television

Video games

Music videos

Awards and nominations

References

External links
 
 
 Interview With Giovanni Ribisi

1974 births
Living people
20th-century American male actors
21st-century American male actors
Male actors from Los Angeles
American male child actors
American male film actors
American male television actors
American male voice actors
American people of English descent
American people of German descent
American people of Italian descent
American Scientologists
Fraternal twin male actors
American twins
Golden Arena winners